Enoggera railway station is located on the Ferny Grove line in Queensland, Australia. It serves the Brisbane suburb of Enoggera.

History
Enogerra was the original terminus when the line opened in 1899. The line was progressively extended to Samford in 1918.

Services
Enogerra station is served by all stops Ferny Grove line services from Ferny Grove to Roma Street, Park Road, Coopers Plains and Beenleigh.

Services by platform

References

External links

Enogerra station Queensland Rail
Enoggera station Queensland's Railways on the Internet
[ Enoggera station] TransLink travel information

Enoggera, Queensland
Railway stations in Brisbane
Railway stations in Australia opened in 1899